Aporocidaris usarpi is a species of sea urchin of the family Ctenocidaridae. Their armour is covered with spines. It is placed in the genus Aporocidaris and lives in the sea. Aporocidaris usarpi was first scientifically described in 2000 by Mooi, David, Fell & Choné.

See also 
 Aporocidaris incerta
 Aporocidaris milleri
 Arachnoides placenta

References 

Ctenocidaridae
Animals described in 2000